Vilyuchinsk is a closed town in Kamchatka Krai, Russia, located on the Kamchatka Peninsula about  across Avacha Bay from Petropavlovsk-Kamchatsky. Population:

History
It was founded as Sovetsky on October 16, 1968 through the amalgamation of three earlier settlements which supplied the Soviet Navy and served as a base for submarine construction: Rybachy, Primorsky, and Seldevaya. In 1970, as with other closed towns in the Soviet Union, it was given a code name based on the nearest major city, becoming known officially as Petropavlovsk-Kamchatsky-50 until 1994. In 1994, the town was renamed after the nearby volcano, Vilyuchik.

Administrative and municipal status
Within the framework of administrative divisions, it is incorporated as Vilyuchinsk Town Under Krai Jurisdiction—an administrative unit with the status equal to that of the districts. As a municipal division, Vilyuchinsk Town Under Krai Jurisdiction is incorporated as Vilyuchinsky Urban Okrug.

Economy
Besides the construction of nuclear submarines, the town's economy is largely reliant on fishing and processing of fish. In the suburb of Rybachy, one of the three original settlements from which the town was created, a squadron of submarines of the Russian Pacific Fleet has been based since August 1938. The local ship-repair industry began to develop in late 1959.

Despite plans for the navy base to be closed in 2003 due to lack of finances, this has continued to operate. The base had been modernized in the late 2000s with newly constructed residential buildings, a hospital, nursery school, and a sports center with a water park opened in 2007 personally by President Vladimir Putin.

Religion
Two Russian Orthodox churches were built in the 1990s, the first in the town.

References

Notes

Sources

External links
Official website of Vilyuchinsk
Unofficial website of Vilyuchinsk
Ribachiy Naval Base - 16th. Submarine Squadron at Author's Project "Russia Begins Here..".

Cities and towns in Kamchatka Krai
Cities and towns built in the Soviet Union
Pacific Coast of Russia
Populated coastal places in Russia
Populated places established in 1968
1968 establishments in Russia
1968 establishments in the Soviet Union
Russian and Soviet Navy submarine bases